The Parliament of Burundi (Kirundi:  Abashingamateka) consists of two chambers:
The Senate (Upper Chamber)
The National Assembly (Lower Chamber)

See also
Politics of Burundi
List of legislatures by country

External links
National Assembly
Senate

Burundi
Government of Burundi
Burundi
Burundi
Politics of Burundi